is a bay south of Yokohama on the west side of Tokyo Bay.  Isogo faces this bay.

Geography of Yokohama
Bays of Japan
Landforms of Kanagawa Prefecture